Attorney General Barber may refer to:

F. Elliott Barber Jr. (1912–1992), Attorney General of Vermont
Herbert G. Barber (1870–1947), Attorney General of Vermont

See also
General Barber (disambiguation)